"Home and Dry" is a song by English synth-pop duo Pet Shop Boys, released on 18 March 2002 as the first UK single and the second US single from their eighth studio album, Release (2002). It reached number 14 on the UK Singles Chart and number 44 on the US Hot Dance Club Play chart.

One of the B-sides, "Sexy Northener", was also released as a promotional single in the United States and peaked at number 15 on the US dance chart, but never received a commercial release.

The song is known to Pet Shop Boys fans for its unusual video, directed by Wolfgang Tillmans, primarily consisting of footage of mice running across tracks and eating discarded food at Tottenham Court Road Underground station. There are occasional shots of the duo performing the song in an empty venue.

The track was remixed the same year by German trance duo Blank & Jones.

Track listings
UK CD single 1
 "Home and Dry"
 "Sexy Northener"
 "Always"

UK CD single 2
 "Home and Dry" (Ambient Mix)
 "Break 4 Love" (UK Radio edit)
 "Break 4 Love" (Friburn & Urik Hi Pass Mix)

UK DVD single
 "Home and Dry" (video)
 "Nightlife"
 "Break 4 Love" (USA Club Mix)

Charts

Weekly charts

Year-end charts

References

2002 singles
2002 songs
Parlophone singles
Pet Shop Boys songs
Songs written by Chris Lowe
Songs written by Neil Tennant